Auerbach in der Oberpfalz is a town in the Amberg-Sulzbach district, Bavaria, Germany. It is located 45 km northeast of Nuremberg. In the subdivision Michelfeld there was a Benedictine monastery which is now a nursing home.

Subdivisions

Degelsdorf
Gunzendorf
Michelfeld
Nasnitz
Nitzlbuch
Ranna
Ranzenthal
Zogenreuth

Mayor
Since May 2008 Joachim Neuß is the mayor. Helmut Ott was the mayor 1996–2008.

Town twinnings

  Laneuveville-devant-Nancy, Lorraine, France

Notable citizens

 Johann Baptist Metz (1928-2019), Catholic theologian
 Heinrich Stromer (1476-1542), professor at the Leipzig university, physician and founder of Auerbach's Cellar.
 Johann Michael Doser (1678–1756) artist, mainly in the fields of wood carvings und sculptures for altars
 Maurus von Schenkl (1749-1816), Benedictine theologian, librarian and canonist,

References

Amberg-Sulzbach